In probability theory relating to stochastic processes, a Feller process is a particular kind of Markov process.

Definitions

Let X be a locally compact Hausdorff space with a countable base. Let C0(X) denote the space of all real-valued continuous functions on X that vanish at infinity, equipped with the sup-norm ||f ||. From analysis, we know that C0(X) with the sup norm is a Banach space.

A Feller semigroup on C0(X) is a collection {Tt}t ≥ 0 of positive linear maps from C0(X) to itself such that
 ||Ttf || ≤ ||f || for all t ≥ 0 and f in C0(X), i.e., it is a contraction (in the weak sense);
 the semigroup property: Tt + s = Tt ∘Ts for all s, t ≥ 0;
 limt → 0||Ttf − f || = 0 for every f in C0(X). Using the semigroup property, this is equivalent to the map Ttf  from t in [0,∞) to  C0(X) being right continuous for every f.

Warning: This terminology is not uniform across the literature. In particular, the assumption that Tt maps C0(X) into itself
is replaced by some authors by the condition that it maps Cb(X), the space of bounded continuous functions, into itself. 
The reason for this is twofold: first, it allows including processes that enter "from infinity" in finite time. Second, it is more suitable to the treatment of
spaces that are not locally compact and for which the notion of "vanishing at infinity" makes no sense.

A Feller transition function is a probability transition function associated with a Feller semigroup.

A Feller process is a Markov process with a Feller transition function.

Generator 

Feller processes (or transition semigroups) can be described by their infinitesimal generator. A function f in C0 is said to be in the domain of the generator if the uniform limit

 

exists. The operator A is the generator of Tt, and the space of functions on which it is defined is written as DA.

A characterization of operators that can occur as the infinitesimal generator of Feller processes is given by the Hille-Yosida theorem. This uses the resolvent of the Feller semigroup, defined below.

Resolvent 

The resolvent of a Feller process (or semigroup) is a collection of maps (Rλ)λ > 0 from C0(X) to itself defined by

It can be shown that it satisfies the identity

Furthermore, for any fixed λ > 0, the image of Rλ is equal to the domain DA of the generator A, and

Examples 

 Brownian motion and the Poisson process are examples of Feller processes. More generally, every Lévy process is a Feller process.
 Bessel processes are Feller processes.
 Solutions to stochastic differential equations with Lipschitz continuous coefficients are Feller processes.
 Every adapted right continuous Feller process on a filtered probability space  satisfies the strong Markov property with respect to the filtration , i.e., for each  -stopping time  , conditioned on the event , we have that for each ,  is independent of  given .

See also 

 Markov process
 Markov chain
 Hunt process
 Infinitesimal generator (stochastic processes)

References

Markov processes